The Zakarpattia Regional Committee of the Communist Party of Ukraine, commonly referred to as the Zakarpattia CPU obkom, was the position of highest authority in the Zakarpattia Oblast, in the Ukrainian SSR of the Soviet Union. 

On 19 November 1944 there was established position of the First Secretaries of the Communist Party of Zakarpattian Ukraine. On 26 November 1944 there was established People's Council of Zakarpattian Ukraine which declared its intention to unite Zakarpattian Ukraine with the Ukrainian SSR. On 29 June 1945 Czechoslovakia and the Soviet Union signed the treaty transferring Zakarpattian Ukraine to the Soviet Union, which was ratified on 30 January 1946. On 30 January 1946 Zakarpattian Ukraine had officially become Zakarpattia Oblast. On 26 February 1946 the position of the First Secretary of the Communist Party of Zakarpattian Ukraine was merged into the Communist Party of Ukraine as the First Secretary of the Communist Party of Zakarpattia Oblast.

The First Secretary was a de facto appointed position usually by the Central Committee of the Communist Party of Ukraine or the First Secretary of the Republic.

List of First Secretaries of the Communist Party of Zakarpattia Oblast (Zakarpattian Ukraine)

See also
Zakarpattia Oblast

Notes

Sources
 World Statesmen.org

Regional Committees of the Communist Party of Ukraine (Soviet Union)
Ukrainian Soviet Socialist Republic
History of Zakarpattia Oblast
1944 establishments in the Soviet Union
1991 disestablishments in the Soviet Union